The Prefecture Apostolic of the Sandwich Islands or the Sandwich Isles Mission, was an ecclesiastical territory of the Roman Catholic Church created by Pope Leo XII on November 27, 1825, encompassing the Sandwich Islands (now the state of Hawai‘i) and entrusted to the care of the Congregation of the Sacred Hearts of Jesus and Mary. Father Alexis Bachelot, SS.CC., was the only Prefect. The Prefecture was made subject to the newly created Vicariate Apostolic of Oriental Oceania on June 2, 1833. The present-day successor to the prefecture is the Diocese of Honolulu.

References

Sandwich Islands
Sandwich Islands, Prefecture Apostolic of
1825 establishments in Hawaii